The révérend Père Dom André Malet (1862–1936) was from 1911 to 1936 abbot of the Trappist abbey of Sainte-Marie-du-Désert at Bellegarde-Sainte-Marie in Haute-Garonne.  He was also a writer on history, liturgy and spiritual life, whose works include La vie surnaturelle, ses éléments, son exercice (1933).

Sources
Étienne Chenevière, Toi seul me suffis,  Westmalle, 1971
 Le père Marie-Joseph Cassant (1878-1903) et dom André Malet (1862-1936)

1862 births
1936 deaths
French abbots
Trappists
20th-century French Catholic theologians